Terrible Sheriff or Two Against All is a 1962 Italian Spaghetti Western parody comedy film directed by Alberto De Martino and Antonio Momplet, cinematographed by Carlo Di Palma, and starring Raimondo Vianello and Walter Chiari.

Cast

References

External links
 
 Terrible Sheriff at Variety Distribution

1962 Western (genre) films
1962 films
1960s Western (genre) comedy films
Italian Western (genre) comedy films
Spanish Western (genre) comedy films
Italian parody films
1960s parody films
Films directed by Alberto De Martino
Films directed by Antonio Momplet
Films with screenplays by Ruggero Maccari
Films with screenplays by José Mallorquí
Films with screenplays by Giulio Scarnicci
Films with screenplays by Ettore Scola
Films scored by Franco Pisano
1960s Italian films